The 2013–14 CA Osasuna season is the 93rd season in club history. Osasuna have completed their 13th consecutive record in the top flight.

Squad

Starting 11
4–2–3–1 Formation

<div style="position: relative;">
 
 
  Fernández 
  Bertrán

Players and staff

Squad information

Transfer in

 

Total spending:  €3.1M

Transfer out

  

Total spending  €0

Technical staff

Kits

  
| 
|

Friendlies

Legend

Pre-season

Competitions

Overall

La Liga

Legend

Matches
Kickoff times are in CET and CEST

Results by round

Results summary

League table

Copa del Rey

Round of 32

Round of 16

Sources

CA Osasuna
CA Osasuna seasons